The following is a list of first appearances of fictional supervillains and teams in American comic books.

For a list of comic book superhero debuts, see List of superhero debuts.

1930s

1940s

1950s

1960s

1970s

1980s

1990s

2000s

2010s

See also
List of Dick Tracy villains
List of superhero debuts
List of years in comics

Sources
Daniels, Les.  The Golden Age of DC Comics: 365 Days.  New York: H.N. Abrams, 2004.

Websites
The History of Comic Books

Supervillain debuts
Comic book publication histories